Not even past may refer to:

"The past is never dead. It's not even past", a line of dialogue spoken by Gavin Stevens, in Requiem for a Nun by William Faulkner
Not Even Past: Barack Obama and the Burden of Race, a 2010 book by Thomas Sugrue